Māris Ļaksa (born 8 September 1981 in Ventspils) is a Latvian professional basketball forward who, as of 2012, is a member of BC Rakvere Tarvas. He is also a member of Latvia national basketball team. His father, Jānis Ļaksa, is a basketball coach.

External links
Basketpedya.com Profile
BBL.net Profile

1981 births
Latvian expatriate basketball people in Estonia
Latvian men's basketball players
Living people
Ikaros B.C. players
People from Ventspils
BC Rakvere Tarvas players
BC Valga players